32nd & Commercial station is a station on the Orange Line of the San Diego Trolley located in  the Stockton neighborhood of San Diego, California. The stop is located in an area where the light rail temporarily breaks from its street-level tracks and runs on a separate right-of-way around the Mt. Hope and Greenwood Cemeteries.

History
32nd & Commercial opened as part of the Euclid Line, the second original line of the San Diego Trolley system, on March 23, 1986.

This station was renovated from late July until December 2012 as part of the Trolley Renewal Project, although the station remained open during construction.

Station layout
There are two tracks, each served by a side platform to the north of the track.

See also
 List of San Diego Trolley stations

References

Orange Line (San Diego Trolley)
San Diego Trolley stations in San Diego
Railway stations in the United States opened in 1986
1986 establishments in California